As early as the Old Kingdom (circa 2670–2195 B.C.), Egyptian artisans fashioned images of gods, kings, and mortals wearing broad collars made of molded tubular and teardrop beads. The Usekh or Wesekh is a personal ornament, a type of broad collar or necklace, familiar to many because of its presence in images of the ancient Egyptian elite. Deities, women, and men were depicted wearing this jewelry. One example can be seen on the famous gold mask of Tutankhamun. The ancient word wsẖ can mean "breadth" or "width" in the Ancient Egyptian language and so this adornment is often referred to as the broad collar.

The usekh broad collar was wrapped around and supported by the neck and shoulders. It is typically adorned with closely placed rows of colored stone beads, or it is made entirely of metal.  The collars were connected with clasps of gold.

Over time across Ancient Egyptian history we witness profound changes to the broad collar. This could be attributed to a shifting mythological perspectives or perhaps due to geographical movement across Egypt.

A scene in the 4th Dynasty tomb of Wepemnofret at Giza connects the usekh collar with dwarfs and the deity Ptah. Bernd Scheel has argued that Ptah, who is sometimes depicted wearing the broad collar, protects the deceased through the collar and that dwarfs had access to that protective magic because of their work making these types of collars. In the 5th Dynasty tomb chapel of Akhethotep (originally located at the Saqqara burial ground, now in the Louvre), one scene distinguishes between two types of collars: the broad collar and the šnw or "encircling" collar.

See also
 Clothing in ancient Egypt

References

External links

Necklaces
Egyptian artefact types